TJ Sokol Dolná Ždaňa was a Slovak football team, based in the town of Dolná Ždaňa. The club was founded in 1966. In the summer of 2012, TJ Sokol Dolná Ždaňa merged with FK Žiar nad Hronom to form FK Pohronie.

References

External links
at dolnazdana.sk 

Sokol Dolna Zdana
Association football clubs established in 1966
Association football clubs disestablished in 2012
1966 establishments in Slovakia
2012 disestablishments in Slovakia